Pipalkoti is a village in Chamoli district in Uttarakhand state of India. The PIN code of Pipalkoti is 246472. Pilakoti is located in hilly area at an elevation of about 1259 mtr. Pipalkoti is connected by National Highway 7 (Former National Highway 58). Pipalkoti village is located on the banks of Alaknanda river and falls in Garhwal Himalaya mountain ranges. It is a halting point for tourists and pilgrims on way to Badrinath and Hemkund Sahib.

See also 

 Pipalkoti (THDC)

References

External links 
 Chamoli district official website
Pipalkoti village overview

Villages in Chamoli district